The Work may refer to:

Philosophy and religion
 The Great Work, an alchemical term for the process of working with the prima materia to create the philosopher's stone
 The Fourth Way, an approach to self-development developed by G. I. Gurdjieff
 The Work of Byron Katie, a method of self-inquiry 
 Opus Dei, a Catholic religious organization which literally means "Work of God"

Arts, entertainment and media
 "The Work, pt. 1", a 2001 song by Prince
 The Work (band), an English experimental rock band
 The Work (film), a 2017 documentary film by Jairus McLeary
 The Work (publication), a student newspaper in Tarlac City, Philippines
 The Work (album), a 2021 album by Rivers of Nihil

See also
 Work (disambiguation)
 The Works (disambiguation)